The 2007–08 Eredivisie was the 52nd season of the Eredivisie, the top division of association football in the Netherlands. The season began in August 2007 and ended on 18 May 2008, with defending champions PSV retaining their title with 72 points.

Promoted teams
The following teams are promoted to the Eredivisie at the start of the season:
VVV-Venlo

League table

Match table

Top scorers

 Last updated: April 20, 2008
 Source: Eredivisie official website

Play-offs

For UEFA competitions
For one Champions League ticket 

For one UEFA Cup playoff ticket

For one UEFA Cup ticket

The winner of match G, FC Twente, qualifies for 2008–09 UEFA Champions League. The loser of match G, Ajax, qualifies for the 2008–09 UEFA Cup. The losers of matches A and B, SC Heerenveen and NAC Breda, faced each other in match H. The winner, SC Heerenveen, qualified for the UEFA Cup. The loser of match H, NAC Breda, faced NEC, the winner of the playoffs featuring FC Groningen, NEC, Roda JC and FC Utrecht. NEC won that match, match J, and clinched the final UEFA Cup ticket, while the loser, NAC Breda, qualified for the UEFA Intertoto Cup.

Relegation

Round 1

|}

Round 2 (best of 3)

|}

Round 3 (best of 3)

|}

The winners of matches G and H will play in the 2008–09 Eredivisie.

Season statistics
Last updated on April 20, 2008.

Scoring
First goal of the season: Kemy Agustien for AZ against VVV-Venlo (18 August 2007)
Widest winning margin: SC Heerenveen 9-0 Heracles Almelo (7 October 2007)
Most goals in a match: SC Heerenveen 9-0 Heracles Almelo (7 October 2007), De Graafschap 1-8 Ajax (August 19, 2007)
Fastest goal in a match: Roy Makaay for Feyenoord against Heracles Almelo (2 December 2007)
Best offensive team: Ajax with 94 goals in 34 matches.
Worst offensive team: Excelsior with 32 goals in 34 matches.
Best defensive team: PSV with 24 goals against in 34 matches.
Worst defensive team: Sparta and VVV-Venlo with 76 goals against in 34 matches.

Cards
First yellow card: Gianni Zuiverloon for SC Heerenveen against Willem II (17 August 2007)
First red card: Patrick Mtiliga for NAC Breda against FC Groningen (18 August 2007)

Overview

Stadiums 2007-08

Kits 2007-2008

References

Eredivisie seasons
Netherlands
1